Sarcodum is a genus of flowering plants in the legume family, Fabaceae. It belongs to the subfamily Faboideae, tribe Wisterieae. Its three species are twining vines growing over shrubs, and are native from southeast mainland China to the Solomon Islands.

Description
The mature stems are reddish brown. The leaves have 8–44 leaflets arranged in pairs, plus a terminal leaflet. Nine of the stamens are fused together, the tenth is free; all curve upwards at the apex.

Taxonomy

The genus Sarcodum was established by João de Loureiro in 1790. The genus name is derived from the Greek  (sarkōdēs) 'fleshy', referring to the seed pod. A 2019 molecular phylogenetic confirmed the monophyly of the genus, placing it in the tribe Wisterieae. Its inflorescences are leafy racemes rather than larger erect panicles.

Species
, Plants of the World Online accepted three genera:
Sarcodum bicolor Adema
Sarcodum scandens Lour.
Sarcodum solomonense R.Clark

Distribution and habitat
The three species of Sarcodum are native to southeast mainland China and Hainan, Vietnam and Laos, and south to Java,  the Lesser Sunda Islands, the Maluku Islands, the Philippines, Sulawesi and the Solomon Islands.

References 

Wisterieae
Fabaceae genera